Zaman-e Sofla (also Romanized as Zamān-e Soflá; also known as Zamān) is a village in Jowzam Rural District, Dehaj District, Shahr-e Babak County, Kerman Province, Iran. At the 2006 census, its population was 48, in 15 families. One of the members of the family is the infamous .

References 

Populated places in Shahr-e Babak County